William F. Flanagan (born 1960) is a Canadian academic. In March 2020, his appointment was announced as the next president of the University of Alberta, succeeding David H. Turpin in July 2020. He previously served as the dean of the faculty of law at Queen's University from to 2005 to 2019.

Flanagan was born in Edmonton, Alberta, the son of two teachers. In his teen years, he worked as a page in the Canadian House of Commons, where his maternal uncle Jack Horner was a Member of Parliament. He attended Carleton University where he earned a Bachelor of Arts degree, then the University of Toronto Faculty of Law, earning a J.D. degree in 1985. He also earned a DEA from the University of Paris in 1986 and a master's degree in law from Columbia Law School in 1989. In 1987, he served as a law clerk for Supreme Court of Canada justice Willard Estey. He joined Queen's University's faculty of law in 1991. He taught international trade and investment, property law and corporate law, and founded the International Law Spring Program at the International Study Centre in the United Kingdom at Queen's University.

Flanagan is married to his husband Saffron Sri, who is originally from Sri Lanka.

References

1960s births
Living people
Carleton University alumni
Columbia Law School alumni
People from Edmonton
Presidents of the University of Alberta
Academic staff of Queen's University at Kingston
University of Paris alumni
University of Toronto Faculty of Law alumni
Canadian expatriates in France
Canadian LGBT academics
21st-century Canadian LGBT people